Common Shiner is an indie rock/Folk band originally from Grand Rapids, Michigan and now based in Chicago, Illinois.

History
Started in 2002 by songwriters Morgan Foster and Tim Haig while both were attending Calvin College, Common Shiner's style has incorporated elements of indie pop, folk rock, and piano rock. The group started out as mostly a hobby, but has since been established as a more serious endeavor, making regular appearances at a wide range of venues throughout the Chicago, Illinois and Grand Rapids, Michigan areas. The band has also toured the East Coast several times. In July, 2007, they played at the South Haven, Michigan Harborfest in front of a crowd of over 5,000 people, solidifying their desire to relocate to Chicago to reach a broader audience and spend more time touring.

Members
The current band members, drummer Vijay Bangalore, keyboardist/vocalist/songwriter Michael James Brooks, and acoustic guitarist/vocalist/songwriter Morgan Foster, as well as former guitarist Andrew Huisjen and former bassist Zach Hache, all met as undergraduates at Calvin College. When Hache moved to Arizona for work, the band hired Bangalore's long-time friend Jake Chandler to take over on bass. "When I first started playing with Morgan more than four years ago, I thought it was just going to be something that I'd do here and there for fun," Huisjen told interviewer Eric Mitts of Recoil Magazine. Instead, the band played at every opportunity, building a loyal following at their repeat venues, including Grand Rapids' Black Rose and The Intersection. The band relocated in the fall of 2007 with the goal of dedicating themselves to music full-time. They soon began a grassroots mainstream radio campaign, achieving some regional success with their single "No Melody" on Adult Contemporary radio charts.

Influences
The group draws on a wide variety of influences, from Death Cab for Cutie and Ben Folds, to Dave Matthews Band. They are often compared to Barenaked Ladies due to their playful style, sometimes quirky lyrics, and vocal similarities between Foster and one of the Barenaked Ladies vocalists. Their songs feature honest, meaningful lyrics that vary from striving toward a social consciousness to light-hearted crushes. “The goal is reflecting the beauty in the common experience. I would say that applies to most of our songs,” Foster told Rachael Recker of the Grand Rapids Press.

Recordings

In their first incarnation, Common Shiner produced a self-published recording titled Reflections, which features songs written by Foster and co-founder and former bassist Tim Haig. The first full-length album, So Long... was also self-published, and was released in summer, 2006. "All the tracks are solid," wrote a critic for West Michigan music magazine Revue.

Believing that having a second album to sell at concerts would increase their visibility, the group decided to release a new album, Viennas, in 2007. Because the members pay for all their recording expenses themselves, Viennas has a shorter playlist than their earlier title. "We're starving artists in an almost-literal sense sometimes, and we just didn't have the money for a full-length this time around," Brooks told Mitts. "We could've waited a bit and done another full-length, but there were enough fans out there who really wanted recordings of these songs as soon as they could get them."

In December 2008, just a year after their relocation to Chicago, the band released a four-track EP entitled EPs Never Have Titles, which was recorded and mixed in Grand Rapids by band friend Chris Andrus of West Michigan native band Bless You Boys. It was released solely as a free online download at www.saynotobadpop.com, marking a new venture for the band in free online music.

The band released the full-length acoustic album Before They Sold Out: Part 1 on May 31, 2011. Before They Sold Out: Part 2 was released in 2013 and featured full-band interpretations of some of the songs from Part 1, as well as other new material. The music video for one of the singles from that album, "Social Mediasochist", went viral in 2014 and as of 2021 has 75 million views.

Awards
 Best Rock Album Nominee - "Viennas" - 2008 WYCE Jammies Awards
 Best New Artist Nominee - 2007 WYCE Jammies Awards
 Best Rock Album Nominee - "So Long..." - 2007 WYCE Jammies Awards
 Most Outstanding Band - Supercave, Calvin College
 Best Crowd Reaction - Supercave, Calvin College

Members
 Morgan Foster - Vocals, Acoustic Guitar, Songwriter
 Michael James Brooks - Keyboard, Vocals, Songwriter
 Jake Chandler - Bass
 Vijay Bangalore - Drums

Former Members
 Tim Haig - Bass, background vocals, Songwriter
 Andrew Huisjen - Electric Guitar, background vocals
 Todd Cole - Drums
 Zachary Hache - Bass

Discography

Notable Appearances
 Ribfest Chicago 6/12/11
 Grand Rapids Festival of the Arts 2013, 2011, 2010, 2009, 2007, 2006
 International Pop Overthrow (Chicago) 2011, 2010, 2009
 Harborfest, South Haven, MI 6/16/07
 Midpoint Music Festival 9/21/06
 Opened for Tim Reynolds 9/13/06
 Social Mediasochist 9/09/14 (Directed by Zoran Gvojic)

References

External links
 Official Website
 Common Shiner Myspace
 Band listing at Sonicbids

Musical groups established in 2002
Musical groups from Michigan
2002 establishments in Michigan